Hornblower may refer to:

Hornblower (surname)
Horn (instrument) blower

In fiction
 Horatio Hornblower, a fictional officer of the British Royal Navy created by C. S. Forester
 Hornblower (TV series), a series of television programmes based on Forester's novels.
 Captain Horatio Hornblower, a 1951 movie starring Gregory Peck & Virginia Mayo.
 Hornblower, the pre-Crisis superhero name of Mal Duncan, a DC Comics character

Other uses
 Hornblower Cruises, San Francisco–based charter yacht, dining cruise and ferry service company
 Hornblower Hybrid, the first known multi-hulled hybrid ferry boat (class) in the United States
 Edward Hornblower House and Barn, Arlington, Massachusetts, USA

See also

Hornblower & Marshall, a U.S. architectural firm
Hornblower and Page, a former finance firm, predecessor to Hornblower and Weeks that was founded by Henry Hornblower
Hornblower & Weeks, a former investment banking firm founded in 1888
Loeb, Rhoades, Hornblower & Co., a former Wall Street brokerage firm
The Hornblower Brothers, a British band
 Justice Hornblower (disambiguation)